(literally "The Morning") is a Swiss French-language daily newspaper published by Edipresse in Lausanne, Switzerland.

The publication of the daily newspaper  was stopped on 21 July 2018. The Sunday and on-line versions continue.

History and profile
The paper is published in tabloid-format. Between 31 October 2005 and 25 September 2009, Edipresse also published , a free daily newspaper distributed in the most-populated areas of Romandy. However, despite the similar names between the new newspapers, they were edited independently.  ceased publication because of the merger of Edipresse with Tamedia, publisher of the competing .

In 1997  had a circulation of 67,522 copies. Its Sunday supplement  had a circulation of 215,024 in 2006. In 2009 's circulation was 58,849 copies.

See also
 List of newspapers in Switzerland

References

External links
  

1972 establishments in Switzerland
Newspapers established in 1972
Daily newspapers published in Switzerland
French-language newspapers published in Switzerland
Mass media in Lausanne